The Sangguniang Panlungsod (SP) is the local legislative body of a city governments in the Philippines. The name of the legislative body comes from the Tagalog words "sanggunian" ("council") – ultimately from the rootword "sangguni" ("to consult") – and "lungsod" ("city"); "city council" is therefore often used as an equivalent term. Members of the city council are referred to as "kagawad"; while in Cebuano-speaking cities they are called "konsehal" (masc.) and "konsehala" (fem.), or "sehal".

The Local Government Code of 1991 governs the composition, powers and functions of the Sangguniang Panlungsod. The members of the Sangguniang Panlungsod, often referred to as councilors, are either elected or serve in an ex officio capacity. The city's vice mayor serves as the presiding officer.

The Sangguniang Panlungsod is a form of the mayor–council government, via the "strong mayor" variant.

Powers, duties, and functions
The Sangguniang Panlungsod, as the legislative body of the city, is mandated by the Local Government Code of 1991 to:

Approve ordinances and resolutions
Generate and maximize the use of resources and revenues for the development plans, program objectives and priorities of the city
Enact ordinances granting franchises and authorizing the issuance of permits or licenses, subject to the provisions of Book II of the Local Government Code of 1991, 
Regulate activities relative to the use of land, buildings and structures within the city
Approve ordinances which shall ensure the efficient and effective delivery of the basic services and facilities as provided for under Section 17 of the Local Government Code
Exercise such other powers and perform such other duties and functions as may be prescribed by law or ordinance

Composition

Presiding officer
The city vice mayor serves as the presiding officer of the Sangguniang Panlungsod, although he has no voting privilege except in cases to break a deadlock. In the absence of the vice mayor, a temporary presiding officer is assigned by the members of the Sangguniang Panlungsod from among themselves.

Regular members
The number of elected councilors a city's Sangguniang Panlungsod is entitled to is determined by statutes. In some cases, the number of regular SP members and/or the delineation of SP districts is provided in the city's own charter (e.g., Sorsogon City) or in a separate Congressional Act (e.g., Bacoor).

In absence of such provisions, the Republic Acts numbered 6636 and 7166 provide that the default size of a city's SP is ten members, elected at large. The exceptions are: 
 if a Metro Manila city comprises a lone legislative district, COMELEC divides the city into two SP districts which elect 6 members each, for a total of 12;
 if a Metro Manila city is divided into two or more legislative districts, each district elects 6 members, unless explicitly provided for in the city's charter or another statute (e.g., Makati, Marikina, Muntinlupa, Parañaque and Taguig);
 if a city outside Metro Manila comprises a lone legislative district, it elects 12 members as one at-large district;
 if a city outside Metro Manila is divided into two or more legislative districts, each district elects 8 members.

Of all the cities, Manila and Quezon City have the most elected councilors with 36 each, followed by Davao City with 24 and Caloocan with 18.

Other members
Similar to the Sangguniang Panlalawigan in the provinces or Sangguniang Bayan in the municipalities, the Local Government Code of 1991 also allocates a Sangguniang Panlungsod seat each to the city chairpersons of the Liga ng mga Barangay (League of Barangays), Pederasyon ng mga Sangguniang Kabataan (Federation of Youth Councils), and other sectoral representatives as determined locally relevant, such as an IP Representative.

See also
 Cabuyao City Council
 Cebu City Council
 Dipolog City Council
 Manila City Council
 Zamboanga City Council

References

Local government in the Philippines
Legislatures of the Philippines
Tagalog words and phrases